The Chinese Elm cultivar Ulmus parvifolia 'Sempervirens' is an American introduction, commonly known by the synonym 'Evergreen', and may also be in synonymy for U. parvifolia 'Pendens'.

Description
Semi-evergreen to evergreen depending on climate, it is described as having a rounded crown and gracefully arching branches bearing deep-green foliage.

Pests and diseases
The species and its cultivars are highly resistant, but not immune, to Dutch elm disease, and unaffected by the Elm Leaf Beetle Xanthogaleruca luteola.

Cultivation
The tree was first listed by Bailey & Bailey in Hortus Second, 747, 1941, and remains in commercial cultivation in the USA. It is not known to be in cultivation in Europe or Australasia.

Synonymy
Ulmus parvifolia 'Evergreen': Plant Buyer's Guide, ed. 5, 253, 1949.
Ulmus parvifolia 'Pendens', possible synonym.
Ulmus parvifolia sempervirens 'True Green':  Monrovia Nursery  Catalogue, 1971.

Accessions

North America

Bartlett Tree Experts, North Carolina, US. Acc. no. 1451
Brooklyn Botanic Garden , New York, US. Acc. no. X00486.

Nurseries

North America

C J Growers, San Diego, California, US.
ForestFarm , Williams, Oregon, US. (as 'Evergreen').
 Monrovia Nursery , Azusa, California, US.

References

External links
http://www.ces.ncsu.edu/depts/hort/consumer/factsheets/trees-new/cultivars/ulmus_parvifolia.htm Ulmus parvifolia cultivar list.

Chinese elm cultivar
Ulmus articles with images
Ulmus